Martin Plaut (born 1950) is a journalist and academic specialising in conflicts in Africa, especially the Horn of Africa. He worked as a BBC News journalist from 1984 to 2012 and is a member of Chatham House. , Plaut was a senior research fellow at the Institute of Commonwealth Studies of the University of London.

Childhood and education
Martin Plaut was born in May 1950 in Cape Town, South Africa, to a furniture designer father and an artist mother. Plaut attended Cape Town High School and worked in his father's shop in Cape Town from 1969 to 1973. He obtained a degree in social science from the University of Cape Town, where he also particpiated in the sit-in during the Mafeje affair in 1968. He obtained an honours degree in industrial relations from the University of Witwatersrand, and in 1977 finished a master of arts degree at the University of Warwick. Plaut joined National Union of South African Students while studying.

Anti-apartheid activities
Plaut joined the British Labour Party. He held senior roles in the party, connecting it with the internal resistance to the South African apartheid system. Plaut resisted the wish by the African National Congress (ANC) to be considered the "sole legitimate representative" of South Africans, since other major resistance groups, including the Pan Africanist Congress were recognised as legitimate by the Labour Party. The ANC unsuccessfully pressured the Labour Party to sack Plaut.

Research and journalism
Plaut worked for two years as an associate fellow at Chatham House, leading research into Africa, afterwards remaining a member.

Plaut joined the BBC in 1984, reporting mainly on the Horn of Africa and southern Africa, and parts of West Africa. He became the Africa editor for BBC World Service News. Plaut was based in London, typically visiting Africa 3–4 times a year. In December 2007 he covered the Christmas massacre in Niangara by the Lord's Resistance Army. After visiting the site of the massacre, conducting an interview and safely returning to a safer location, he had difficulties explaining to editors in London that revisiting the scene to refilm in a way preferred by editors was impossible. Plaut retired from the BBC in 2012.

In 2017, Plaut described Eritrea as a "mafia state", in the sense that Constitution of Eritrea was written and ratified but not implemented; there had not been any elections since independence; Eritrea had "no annual budget"; and Eritrea was effectively ruled in an "arbitrary and personal" way by president Isaias Afwerki together with senior military officers and officials from the People's Front for Democracy and Justice (PFDJ). Plaut stated that mafia-like characteristics included Isaias controlling Eritrea "with ruthless efficiency", controlling Eritreans abroad by threats and intimidation, and Eritrea having a "covert network of illegal activities" run by close colleagues of Isaias, acting "more like a Mafia don enforcing his will than a legitimate head of state". Plaut attributed the mafia-like nature of the Eritrean state in 2017 to the historical role of the Eritrean People's Revolutionary Party, a Leninist party that secretly controlled the much broader Eritrean People's Liberation Front in the fight for independence. The major illegal activities listed by Plaut included human trafficking; a covert parallel economy in hard currency, dominated by a 2% Rehabilitation Tax on the Eritrean diaspora; and surveillance and intimidation of the Eritrean diaspora.

In 2017, Plaut argued that the quality of reporting on African conflicts by Western media had worsened due to budget drops, fewer correspondents in Africa, and difficulties in persuading editors to fund journalists' travel to Africa. He stated that careful preparation and having a strong support team, as was his case at the BBC, is "essential for a successful assignment".

, Plaut was a senior research fellow at the Institute of Commonwealth Studies of the University of London.

Publications
Plaut has published several books on his studies of African wars and politics, and observations of areas of London.
 Unfinished Business: Ethiopia and Eritrea at war, Red Sea Press, 2005, (editor, with Dominique Jacquine-Berdal) 
 Who rules South Africa? Jonathan Ball, 2012 (with Paul Holden) 
 Curious Kentish Town (with Andrew Whitehead), Five Leaves Publications, Nottingham, 2014 
 Curious Camden Town (with Andrew Whitehead), Five Leaves Publications, Nottingham, 2015 
 Promise and Despair: The first struggle for a non-racial South Africa, 1899 – 1914, Jacana Media, 2016 
 Understanding Eritrea: Inside Africa's most repressive state, Hurst, October, 2017 
 Robert Mugabe, Ohio University Press, April 2018 (with Sue Onslow) 
 Understanding South Africa, Hurst, 2019 (with Carien du Plessis) 
 Dr Abdullah Abdurahman: South Africa's first elected black politician, Jacana Media, 2020

Harassment
When interviewed by Amnesty International in 2019, Plaut stated that he had been harassed by PFDJ members and supporters several times. At a 3 February 2014 University of London conference, Plaut was shouted at and accused of taking bribes by the First Secretary of the Eritrean embassy. On 30 November 2018, he was lured into a meeting at a cafe in London, splashed with a bucketful of liquid and filmed by the attacker and other Eritreans, who called Plaut a "traitor". The attacker was prosecuted.

References

Living people
War correspondents
Writers from Cape Town
University of Cape Town alumni
1950 births